Catherine "Cathy" Yu Untalan-Vital is a Filipino environmentalist, fashion model, psychologist, and beauty queen. She competed and won the beauty title of Miss Philippines-Earth 2006 and the international Miss Earth Water 2006. She is the executive director of Miss Earth Foundation, the environmental-social-humanitarian outreach arm of Miss Earth beauty pageant. She is  a TV anchor at People's Television Network in the Philippines.

Background
Catherine Untalan finished her high school education at St. Paul College of Parañaque. She graduated cum laude in  Psychology at the University of the Philippines Diliman and received her diploma in Environment and Natural Resource Management from the University of the Philippines Open University and is currently pursuing her masters in Coastal Track on the same university.

On August 18, 2006, she cohosted the awards night of Moonrise Film Festival, an annual film festival covering various environmental and cultural issues, sponsored by the Center for Environmental Awareness and Education, which was held at the Gateway Mall in Cubao, Quezon City.
 
She was a courtside reporter for the San Beda Red Lions during the first half of the 82nd season of the National Collegiate Athletic Association (NCAA). Two years later, she became the courtside reporter for her alma mater's team, the UP Fighting Maroons during the University Athletic Association of the Philippines' 67th season.

She is the spokesperson of the Philippine Department of Environment and Natural Resources for various campaigns and of the Philippine Department of Health for their anti-tobacco smoking campaign. The Sustainable Energy Development Program of the United States Agency for International Development (USAID) also chose her to be the spokesperson of their biofuels campaigns. The USAID cited her efforts and participation in their programs and she was awarded an environmental ambassador recognition, the first to be given such distinction by the agency. She hosted a show in NBN Channel 4 entitled Kapihan ng Bayan with veteran broadcast journalists, Mario Garcia and Ely Saludar. Currently, she's a columnist in the first green lifestyle magazine in the Philippines, called, Gen G Magazine.

Beauty pageant
She was crowned Miss Philippines Earth 2006. She represented Philippines at Miss Earth 2006 and she won Miss  Water (2nd Runner-up).

See also

Athena Imperial
Diane Querrer
Emma Tiglao
Ganiel Krishnan
Tina Marasigan

External links
Official Miss Earth website
Miss Earth Foundation website

References

Living people
Miss Earth 2006 contestants
Miss Philippines Earth winners
1985 births
Star Magic
People's Television Network
University of the Philippines Diliman alumni
Filipino television journalists
University of the Philippines Open University alumni
Women television journalists